The women's high jump at the 2013 Asian Athletics Championships was held at the Shree Shiv Chhatrapati Sports Complex on 4 July.

Results

References
Results

High
High jump at the Asian Athletics Championships
2013 in women's athletics